Hyperolius lateralis is a species of frog in the family Hyperoliidae.
It is found in Burundi, Democratic Republic of the Congo, Kenya, Rwanda, Tanzania, and Uganda.
Its natural habitats are subtropical or tropical moist lowland forests, subtropical or tropical swamps, subtropical or tropical moist montane forests, rivers, swamps, and heavily degraded former forest.
It is threatened by habitat loss.

References

lateralis
Amphibians described in 1940
Taxonomy articles created by Polbot